The SIAI S.21 was an Italian racing flying boat built by SIAI for the 1921 Schneider Trophy race.

Design and development

The S.21 was a single-seat biplane flying boat with its upper wing being of shorter span that its lower wing. Its  Ansaldo San Giorgio 4E-14 engine was mounted on struts above its hull and below its upper wing and drove a four-bladed pusher propeller. Small stabilizer floats were mounted beneath the lower wing on each side.

Operational history
During test flights, the S.21 proved extremely difficult to control, and the only pilot who had success with it was Guido Jannello, who had already made an impression at the 1918 Schneider Trophy, in a Savoia S.13. When Jannello fell ill at the time of the 1921 Schneider Trophy race and was unable to pilot it, the S.21 was withdrawn from the race.

Popular culture
 In the Japanese animated film Porco Rosso, the main protagonist's plane is referred to as a Savoia S.21. However, it is patterned after this plane and does not closely resemble the real S.21, and more closely resembles the Macchi M.33.

Operators

Specifications

See also

Notes

References

Aviation: SIAI racing seaplanes

S.21
1920s Italian sport aircraft
Flying boats
Schneider Trophy
Biplanes
Single-engined pusher aircraft
Aircraft first flown in 1921